"Superman: Last Stand of New Krypton" is a 2010 crossover story arc in the various Superman comic book series published by DC Comics. It follows the events from World of New Krypton and leads directly into War of the Supermen.

In this story arc, Superman and the Kryptonians defend their planet of New Krypton from an invasion of Brainiac's robotic army.  The Man of Steel is aided in his effort by several members of the Superman Family, including Supergirl, Superboy, Mon-El and the Legion of Super-Heroes.  Meanwhile, the heroes' efforts to defeat Brainiac are confounded by the machinations of two of Superman's most dangerous enemies, Lex Luthor and General Zod.

Plot summary

Brainiac unleashes his robot army against the planet of New Krypton, and the Kryptonian citizens rise up to fight the drones. Superman manages to enter Brainiac's ship after penetrating its force field. Supergirl leads the Kryptonians against the drones, but is attacked by an anti-Kryptonian Brainiac probe. Superboy, Mon-El, and the Legion of Super-Heroes join the fight and save Supergirl and the predestined future of their home worlds. The Legion explains to Zod that, just as Krypton's city of Kandor was held in a bottle onboard Brainiac's ship, other planets' cities are also imprisoned, and, therefore, Zod cannot destroy Brainiac's ship until the cities can be rescued. Zod sends Supergirl off and then arrests the Legionnaires, branding them terrorists. Meanwhile, Superman is about to face off against Brainiac when he is knocked down by a kryptonite energy blast fired by Lex Luthor and subsequently captured.

Alura confronts Zod and tells him the Legion are not terrorists. As Alura and Zod argue, the Legion attempts to break into Brainiac's ship, but fail. Inside Brainiac's ship, Superman and Mon-El continue to gather the trapped cities, but are confronted by a re-energized Brainiac. During the brawl, Superman is able to get hold of the telepathic Lanothians but Brainiac teleports away with all the others bottled cities that Mon-El and Superman had in their possession. The Legion manages to enter Brainiac's ship thanks to Brainiac 5's help. But even this does not seem to help, and New Krypton is put into a bottle. Superman is pummeled by Brainiac's weapon's system and is declared dead. Zod says that Brainiac has lost.

The city that Luthor expanded is still growing, now putting Kandor at risk. As Brainiac 5 works on the problem, Supergirl is shocked to discover Superman impaled by pieces of Brainiac's ship as a result of the explosion.  Brainiac confronts Luthor and is furious that Lex sabotaged his ship. Luthor mocks him and spits in his eye before Brainiac angrily snaps Luthor's neck, killing him.

Meanwhile, Zod is eager for a final showdown with Brainiac, who calls Zod a coward for confronting Brainiac with his powers intact and an army of super-powered Kryptonians at his back. In response, Zod fires the red sun radiation from an Archer rifle at himself, to remove his powers. Brainiac 5 gives Superman a transfusion of Conner's blood and exposes him to a very large dose of concentrated synthesized yellow sun rays. Using these techniques, Brainiac 5 is able to revive Superman. 

Despite the loss of his powers, Zod is able to get the upper hand and force Brainiac to his knees. Zod is about to shoot Brainiac when Superman intervenes. This causes a heated argument between Superman and Zod. Zod commands his soldiers to restrain Kal-El so Zod can proceed with the execution of Brainiac. Brainiac 5, sensing that this is his moment of destiny, steps in and teleports himself and Brainiac off of New Krypton.

It is revealed that Lex used a Luthor robot, supplied by Toyman, to accomplish his mission on New Krypton. It was the robot that was "killed" by Brainiac. Lex is very much alive and discussing with General Lane how his objective, to bring chaos to New Krypton, was achieved. Lex has been working as an agent of General Lane all along. The disarray that Lex caused provides Lane with a window of opportunity as he prepares for the impending war with New Krypton. Lex receives a Presidential pardon for his efforts.

The story has two separate independent endings; following the destruction, Zod rallies his remaining Kryptonian forces and declares war on the planet Earth (which concludes in Superman: War of the Supermen).  Meanwhile, the time traveling Legionaires (specifically Mon-El) return all the shrunken cities captured from Brainiac's ship to their predestined home worlds.

Collected editions
Superman: The Last Stand of New Krypton Vol. 1 (168 pages, Collecting, Collecting Superman: The Last Stand of New Krypton #1-2, Adventure Comics #8-9, Supergirl #51 and Superman #698)
Superman: The Last Stand of New Krypton Vol. 2 (128 pages, Collecting Superman: The Last Stand of New Krypton #3, Adventure Comics #10-11, Supergirl #52 and Superman #699)

References

Last Stand of New Krypton
Superhero comics